Appleton-Century-Crofts, Inc. was a division of the Meredith Publishing Company. It is a result of the merger of Appleton-Century Company with F.S. Crofts Co. in 1948. Prior to that The Century Company had merged with D. Appleton & Company in 1933.

The Century Company and its subsequent incarnations published the New Century Dictionary.

Eventually Meredith sold the majority of the company and the Appleton name to Prentice-Hall in 1973. Part of the company became part of Hawthorn Books and New Win Publishing.

Timeline
 1948 Appleton-Century Company, founded in 1933, merged with F. S. Crofts Co., founded in 1924, to form Appleton-Century-Crofts.
 1960 Purchased by Meredith Publishing Company
 1969 Meredith trade books division sold to Hawthorn Books
 1973 Appleton textbook division purchased by Prentice Hall; the medical division retains the Appleton name
 1974 New Century division sold to Charles Walther, and was later renamed New Win Publishing
 1998 Prentice Hall merged with Pearson Education
 1999 Pearson Education sells successor company Appleton & Lange to McGraw-Hill
 2003 Academic Learning Company, LLC acquired New Win Publishing, which was a division of New Century Publishing

Imprints
 Century vagabond books of travel

See also
 Duell, Sloan and Pearce

References

 New Century Dictionary. (1963). ii. New York:Appleton-Century-Crofts, Inc.

External links
 Appleton-Century mss., 1846-1962 at the Lilly Library, Indiana University

Defunct book publishing companies of the United States
Publishing companies established in 1948
Publishing companies disestablished in 1973
1948 establishments in New York (state)
1973 disestablishments in New York (state)
American companies established in 1948
Companies disestablished in 1973